Hawks Nest is a small town of the Mid-Coast Council local government area in the Hunter and Mid North Coast regions of New South Wales, Australia, located north of Port Stephens between the Tasman Sea and the Myall River. It was named after a large hawk's nest in a tree on the Myall River that was used as a navigational aid. The traditional custodians of this land are the Worimi people.

History

Geography
It is bordered by the Tasman Sea to the east, the Myall River to the west and Port Stephens to the south. However, the rest of the town is generally low, flat, sandy and covered in coastal scrubland, with some bushland, resulting in the northern part of the suburb being accessible only by four-wheel drive vehicles until the 1980s.

Hawks Nest is located directly across the river from Tea Gardens and was connected by the Singing Bridge in 1974. Before this the river crossing was made by a small car ferry. Most (approximately 95%) of the suburb is still uninhabited with the population concentrated around the Hawks Nest township, on the Myall River and Winda Woppa on Port Stephens.

Demographics
At the 2016 census there were 1,223 people in Hawks Nest. 79.9% of people were born in Australia and 89.4% of people spoke only English at home. The most common responses for religion were Anglican 30.0%, No Religion 25.9% and Catholic 20.8%.

While nearby Tea Gardens is primarily a residential and commercial area, Hawks Nest tends to be dominated by holiday rentals and caravan parks which causes the population to vary considerably with the influx of tourists.

Tourism
Jimmys Beach and the Tasman Sea on the east (Bennetts Beach or The Main Beach, as it is commonly referred to) are popular resorts.  The Myall Lakes are a short drive north. Hawks Nest has many shops and cafes catering to the tourist trade and, with its sandy beaches and bush walks, proximity to Sydney, and much greater seclusion than suburbs on the southern shores of Port Stephens, it is a popular weekend getaway for Sydneysiders. Hawks Nest was well known as the location of holiday retreats belonging to then Prime Minister John Howard until, in 1998, he decided to abandon his family's regular holiday spot of twenty years due to alleged media harassment. John Howard has returned to Hawks Nest after leaving politics in 2007.

The local golf course was formally opened on 12 August 1978. It was designed in 1968 by Matt Lauder, a professional golfer and nephew of Scottish comedian, Sir Harry Lauder.

Holiday activities in the area include swimming, snorkeling and diving, golfing, bush walking, dolphin and whale spotting, four-wheel driving, caravanning and fishing.

Animals such as koalas, dingoes and dolphins can be observed in the area.

Notes

  The density figure presented is that of the entire suburb.
  Average elevation of the suburb as shown on 1:100000 map 9332 PORT STEPHENS.
  Area calculation is based on 1:100000 map 9332 PORT STEPHENS.

References

External links

 

Towns in the Hunter Region
Suburbs of Mid-Coast Council
Coastal towns in New South Wales